Mehsana, also spelled Mahesana, is a city and municipality in Mehsana district, in the Indian state of Gujarat. Established in 14th century, the city was under Gaekwads of Baroda State from 18th century to the independence of India in 1947. The municipality was established in 1919–20. The town has population of about 185,000. Dairy, oil and natural gas are major industries while there are several small and medium enterprises in the city.

History

Jaisinh Brahmabhatt describes the following legend in his poems from 1932 AD: Mehsana was established by Mehsaji Chavda, Rajput heir of the Chavda dynasty. He constructed the Torana (arc gate) of the city and a temple dedicated to Goddess Toran on Bhadrapad Sud 10 in Vikram Samvat 1414 (1358 AD). The legend is corroborated in Pragat Prabhavi Parshwanath athva Parshwanathna Chamatkaro published in Vikram Samvat 1909 (1823 AD) by Manilal Nyalchand Shah who also mentioned in it that Mehsaji built a temple dedicated to Chamunda.  Another legend says that Mehsaji established the town in Vikram Samvat 1375 (1319 AD). Both legends describes that the town is named after Mehsaji. These legends also inconclusively establish that the town was founded during the Rajput period.

Gaekwads conquered Baroda and established Baroda State in 1721. They expanded their rule in north Gujarat and established Patan as its administrative headquarters. Later the headquarters was moved to Kadi and subsequently to Mehsana in 1902 when the city was connected by the Gaekwar's Baroda State Railway which was opened on 21 March 1887. Sayajirao Gaekwad III built Rajmahal, a palace in 1904.

Baroda State merged with the Union of India after independence in 1947. It was merged into Bombay State as Mehsana district in 1949. Later it became part of Gujarat in 1960 after the division of Bombay state into Gujarat and Maharashtra. Mehsana is headquarters of Mehsana district in north Gujarat.

Geography
By Ahmedabad-Palnpur Railway line, the town is divided in two: the east and western parts are known as Mehsana-1 and Mehsana-2 respectively.

Administration
Mehsana Municipality (Nagar Palika) was established in 1919–20. Following the merger of Baroda state with Bombay State on 1 August 1949, it was governed by Bombay District Municipal Act, 1902. Since 1 January 1956, it is governed under Gujarat Nagar Palika Act, 1963. It falls under Mehsana Metropolitan Region.

Demographics

 India census, the population of Mehsana was 184,991, of which male and female were 97,440 and 87,551, respectively. Its urban-metropolitan population was 190,753 of which 100,558 were males and 90,195 were females.

The sex ratio was 894 females to 1,000 males. Mehsana had an average literacy rate of 84.26%, higher than the national average. Male literacy was 91.88%, and female literacy was 76.12%. 9.4% of Mehsana's population was under 6 years of age.

At 762, Mehsana had the lowest child sex-ratio among the urban centres in India.

Religion

Hinduism is the majority religion in Mehsana with 88.18% of the population being followers. Islam is the second-most-popular religion in the city at 9.26%, followed by Jainism at 1.62%, Sikhism 0.28%, Buddhism 0.28%, and Christianity at 0.27%. Around 0.01% identified with other religions and approximately 0.36% were of no particular religion.

Places of worship
Major Hindu temples include: Pushtimarg temples of Madanmohanlalji temple and Dwarkadhishji temple,  Toranvali Mata temple, Brahmani Mata temple, Hinglaj Mata temple, Bahuchar Mata temple, Kalupur Gadi Swaminarayan temple, BAPS Swaminarayan temple, Gayatri temple, Ambika Mata temple and Somnath Mahadev temple. Bhimnath Mahadev Temple was renovated in 1982.

Simandhar Swami Jain Derasar is a temple located near Modhera crossroads. The central deity (moolnayak) of the temple is a  white idol of Simandhar Swami in lotus position (padmansa). The temple was established in 1971 under guidance of Jain monk Kailassagarsuri.

There is a temple dedicated to Ayyappa established by the South Indian community and a Gurdwara Sahib established by the Sikh community near the Radhanpur crossroads on State Highway 41.

Christian churches include Mar Gregorious Orthodox Syrian Church.

Places of interest

Rajmahal is a palace built in 1904 by Sayajirao Gaekwad III. Boter Kothani Vav was constructed during the reign of Mughal emperor Aurangzeb. An inscription dated 1674 AD in Persian and Devnagari scripts states that it was commissioned by Shah Gokaldas of Shrimali caste, Laghu Shakha, and his mother Manabai for public welfare. There is another stepwell known as Badiyashi Vav in Biladi Baug. It was constructed by Shah Virchandji Jadavji.

Other historical monuments include Shrimad Yashovijayji Jain Sanskrit Pathshala, T. J. High School, Kesharbai School and Mehsana district local board office. Dudhsagar Dairy plant is a postmodernist building designed by Achyut Kanvinde.

Public amenities
Para Lake, officially Swami Vivekanand Lake, was excavated during the Gaekwad rule. It was redeveloped and opened in 2019. Nagalpur Lake is proposed for development as a public space. There are nine gardens in the city including Parashuram Play Ground, Arvind Baug and Biladi Baug (Mahatma Gandhi garden). Sardar Patel Stadium is a multi-purpose stadium with capacity of 3000 people. It houses sports facilities and swimming pool. Vanikar Club is also there.

Economy

Industries
Mehsana has dairy, agriculture and road-equipment based industry. It also has oil and natural gas production fields and various small- and medium-size industries. The banking and finance sectors have nationalised, cooperative, and private sector banks. Many large and small road-equipment industries are established in Mehsana-Dediyasan Gujarat Industrial Development Corporation (GIDC).

Dairy
The city is known for its local Mehsani breed of buffaloes.

The Mehsana District Cooperative Milk Producer's Union, popularly known as Dudhsagar Dairy, is a member of the state-level Gujarat Cooperative Milk Marketing Federation and the largest dairy in Asia, processing on average 1.41 million kilograms of milk each day. It has established a network for procuring milk from 4,500,000 milk producers through 1,150 village milk cooperatives.

Oil and natural gas
Mehsana also has 1,311 oil wells, and 16 gas wells producing 6,000 tonnes per day..

Entertainment

Wide-Angle Multiplex and Wow Cine Pulse provide entertainment facilities. Shanku's Water Park, Tirupati Nature Park, Bliss Water Park and Taranga Jain temple are located nearby. Mehsana has three radio stations: Top FM (92.7 MHz), Radio Mirchi (91.9 MHz) and relay station of Akashvani (100.1 MHz).

Education

Mehsana has several facilities offering education to graduation and post-graduation. The Municipal Arts and Urban Bank Science College is affiliated by Hemchandracharya North Gujarat University. Gujarat Power Engineering and Research Institute and Saffrony Institute of Technology offer courses in engineering and management. B. S. Patel College of Pharmacy offers courses in pharmacy, and is affiliated with Gujarat Technological University. Sarvajanik Kelvani Mandal Trust offers education in the fields of pharmacy, nursing, and homeopathy.

There are many primary and higher-secondary schools affiliated with Central Board of Secondary Education (CBSE) or Gujarat Board including: Kendriya Vidyalaya, ONGC, Mehsana, Jawahar Navodaya Vidyalaya (JNV), Vadnagar, Shanku's Divine Child School and N.G. International School. K. V. Mehsana made a beginning in the year 1980 with classes 1 to 10 with two sections each and one section science stream and one  commerce stream in Class XI and XII. It is a Hindi, English Medium school. In 2021, 966 students were enrolled. T. J. Highschool operated by Nagrik Kelvani Mandal was established in 1889 and Urban Bank Vidhalaya. Gurukul English Medium School started in 2012. Sarvajanik Kelvani Mandal Trust also runs many schools in north Gujarat. Other schools include Sabari Vidya Vihar, run by Dharma Sastha Seva Trust, and Bethany Mission School.

Transport

Local 
The Mehsana Municipal City Bus Service is operated on eight routes.

Road
Gujarat State Road Transport Corporation (GSRTC) buses also connect Mehsana to other cities and villages. Auto rickshaws and taxis are available.

It is connected to Gandhinagar, Himmatnagar, Patan, Unjha and Palanpur, Visnagar via state highways.

Rail
Mahesana railway station is on the Jaipur–Ahmedabad line with daily trains to and from Delhi and Mumbai, and direct weekly or bi-weekly trains connecting major cities in north and south India, including Bangalore.

Air
The nearest passenger airport is Sardar Vallabhbhai Patel International Airport at Ahmedabad. Prepaid taxis and GSRTC bus are available to Mehsana from the airport.

Mehsana Airport is currently used for non-scheduled operation and as a civil aviation training centre, operated by Ahmedabad Aviation and Aeronautics Ltd. It has an area covering .

References

 
14th-century establishments in India
Cities and towns in Mehsana district